Bulmer may refer to:

People
Bulmer (surname)
Bulmer (family), an English family
Bulmer (directories), a Victorian era historian, surveyor and compiler of directories

Places
Bulmer, Essex, England
Bulmer, North Yorkshire, England

Other uses
Bulmer (typeface), an English transitional classification serif typeface
H. P. Bulmer, English cider manufacturer
 - a British merchant ship damaged in a hurricane and condemned at Sadras in 1821
USS Bulmer, a United States Navy Clemson-class destroyer (named after Captain Roscoe Carlyle Bulmer USN) that was launched in 1920 and saw service during WW2.

See also
Bulmers (Republic of Ireland), Irish cider manufacturer